Yuga Purushudu is a 1978 Indian Telugu-language action film produced by C. Ashwini Dutt under the Vyjayanthi Movies banner and directed by K. Bapayya. It stars N. T. Rama Rao and Jaya Prada, with music composed by K. V. Mahadevan. The film was remade in Hindi as Mard Ki Zabaan (1987). The film was declared a Hit at the box office.

Plot 
Pushpagiri Zamindar's (Prabhakar Reddy) only daughter Janaki (Pushpalata) loves and marries an ordinary man, Ranganna (Kanta Rao). After some time, the couple blessed with a baby boy, Kalyan. Knowing this, the Zamindar sends his nephew Dhananjay (Dhulipala) to get them back when Dhanunjaya makes ploy, tries to kill the child in the name of the Zamindar. Ranganna & his younger brother Jaggu (Jaggayya) obstructs their way when Janaki escapes and hands over the child to a loyal servant Balaram (Rao Gopal Rao). At that moment, Balaram handovers his children Anand & Madhavi to Janaki for the rear sends Kalyan to Singapore through his brother Banerjee (Rajanala) and he grows up as Rajesh. Meanwhile, Ranganna dies in that quarrel and Jaggu becomes a dacoit to take avenge against the Zamindar. Years roll by, Rajesh (N. T. Rama Rao) becomes the king of martial arts who defeats many worldwide champions. Latha, granddaughter of Zamindar is a hardcore fan of Rajesh and they both fall in love. Once in a competition, Anand (Chandra Mohan) competes with Rajesh to protect his deceased mother Janaki. In the ring, Rajesh asks Anand to back out because he understands Anand is not capable. But he does not listen, gets badly wounded and dies. Before dying, he calls and explains his situation. Now Rajesh decides to make penance, so, he stops his profession and moves to take care of Anand's mother & sister. After reaching there, Madhavi requests him not to reveal the truth to their mother. Rajesh brings them to the city, joins Janaki in the hospital and starts working as a taxi driver for their livelihood. One night, while escaping from goons Latha is saved by Rajesh when he learns that she is the granddaughter of the Zamindar and has a life threat from her maternal uncle Dhanunjaya and his son Maruthi Rao (Satyanarayana) for the property. Here Latha requests Rajesh to arrive as her absconding cousin Kalyan and he agrees. Knowing that Kalyan is arriving, Dhanunjay and Maruti Rao want to eliminate him, fortunately, they contact Rajesh for this crime when he plays a double game and enters the house as Kalyan. Hereabouts, he gets affectionate towards his grandfather and starts teaching these culprits a lesson and makes his grandfather normal. After that, Rajesh is informed that the Zamindar has a hazard from Jaggu. So, he wants to catch him and reaches his horizon. In the combat, Jaggu recognises Rajesh as Kalyan by the tattoo on his chest when Rajesh brings out the reality regarding Zamindar to Jaggu. Sensing it, Dhanunjaya & Maruthi Rao kidnaps the entire family. At last, Rajesh sees their end and protects them. Finally, the movie ends on a happy note with the marriage of Rajesh & Latha.

Cast 

N. T. Rama Rao as Rajesh / Kalyan
Jaya Prada as Latha
Jaggayya as Jaggu
Rao Gopala Rao as Balaram
Satyanarayana as Maruti Rao
Allu Ramalingaiah as Diwanji
Prabhakar Reddy as Zamindar
Raja Babu as Mohan
Chandra Mohan as Anand
Kanta Rao as Ranganna
Rajanala as Benerjee
Dhulipala as Dhanunjay
Eswara Rao as Dr. Chandra Shekar
Chalapathi Rao as Naveen
Pushpalata as Janaki
Madhavi as Madhavi
Fatafat Jayalaxmi as Rosy
Komilla Veerk as item number

Soundtrack 

Music composed by K. V. Mahadevan.

References

External links 
 

1970s Telugu-language films
1978 action films
1978 films
Films directed by K. Bapayya
Films scored by K. V. Mahadevan
Indian action films
Telugu films remade in other languages